The Virgin Islands Superior Court is the trial court of general jurisdiction for the United States Virgin Islands. The court is composed of nine judges. They are appointed by the governor and confirmed by the Legislature. Effective January 29, 2007 the Supreme Court of the Virgin Islands assumed jurisdiction over appeals from the Superior Court.

Composition 
The judges of the Virgin Islands Superior Court are divided among two divisions, the division of St. Croix and the division of St. Thomas/St. John. The position of presiding judge alternates every three years between the two superior court divisions to the judge with the most seniority. Judges are appointed by the governor and confirmed by the Legislature for a term of six years.

History
The 1921 territorial law created three Police Courts, one for St. Thomas and St. John, and two for St. Croix. The 1954 Revised Organic Act merged these into the Municipal Court of St. Thomas and St. John, and the Municipal Court of St. Croix. In 1965, these were merged into the Municipal Court of the Virgin Islands, and renamed the Territorial Court of the Virgin Islands in 1976. The court gained original jurisdiction over all local civil matters in 1991, and criminal matters in 1994; appeals were directed to the federal District Court of the Virgin Islands. When the Supreme Court of the Virgin Islands was created to accept appeals in 2004 (under a 1984 federal revision to the Revised Organic Act), the Territorial Court was renamed the Superior Court of the Virgin Islands.

References

External links
Superior Court of the Virgin Islands

Supreme Court
United States Virgin Islands law
Virgin Islands
Courts and tribunals with year of establishment missing